Brian Kite is a producing artistic director, theater director, actor, academic administrator. He is an Interim Dean of the University of California, Los Angeles School of Theater, Film and Television. Kite has served as Chair and Theater Directing Professor at the UCLA Theater Department for 5 years prior to becoming the Interim Dean at UCLA school of Theater, Film and Television.

Education 
Kite received a Bachelor of Arts in Theater from the University of California, Los Angeles. He then earned a Master of Fine Arts in directing and theatrical production at the University of California, Los Angeles.

Career 

Before becoming a Interim Dean at UCLA, Kite had an extensive directing career. Between 2008 and 2015 Kite served as producing artistic director of La Mirada Theatre for the Performing Arts. Where he directed such show as Billy Elliot, Les Misérables, American Idiot, Miss Saigon, Dinner with Friends, Steel Magnolias, and Little Shop of Horrors.Kite began teaching as a visiting associate professor at UCLA in October of 2004. After 10 years of serving as a visiting associate professor Kite was hired in 2015 as a full time faculty member and the Chair for UCLA Theater Department at University of California, Los Angeles School of Theater, Film and Television. In 2019, upon the departure of former Theater, Film and Television Dean, Teri Schwartz, Brian E. Kite was appointed Special Academic Senior Associate Dean in 2019 for 6 month before becoming the Interim Dean of the UCLA School of Theater, Film and Television in January 2020.

Kite has spent of his career directing live theater across the globe. He has served as producing artistic director of La Mirada Theatre for the Performing Arts for 7 years prior to working as an associate director at La Mirada for over 3 years. He has closely collaborated with The Adam Mickiewicz Institute to direct the musical Virtuoso and Irena in Poznań, Poland. Kite served as the Chair of the Board of Governors of the L.A. Stage Alliance, holds an appointment as a Visiting Professor at the Shanghai Theatre Academy.

Brian E Kite's directing career has lasted over 30 years. Kite is the recipient of the L.A.'s Ovation Award for Best Direction of a Musical for his production of Spring Awakening and was again nominated for his productions of Les Misérables and American Idiot''.

References 

Living people
UCLA School of Theater, Film and Television faculty
American theatre directors
Year of birth missing (living people)